"Gonna Make You A Star" is a pop/rock recording by David Essex. Written by David Essex and produced by Jeff Wayne, "Gonna Make You a Star" was Essex's first number-one, spending three weeks at the top of the UK Singles Chart, in November 1974. It peaked at number 105 on the Billboard Hot 100 chart in the USA. The record featured prominent use of the synthesizer.

In 2007, the song was released again by Lee Mead, winner of the Any Dream Will Do BBC One TV competition, which was then shown in the spring of 2009 in the US on BBC America; Mead then starred in the title role for 18 months in Andrew Lloyd Webber's West End revival of Joseph and the Amazing Technicolour Dreamcoat.  British comedian Peter Kay had his character Marc Park release "Gonna Make You a Star" as his first single after winning the fictional Talent Trek competition in his 2000 Channel 4 spoof documentary series That Peter Kay Thing.

Essex's song was also featured in his jukebox musical, All the Fun of the Fair.

Charts

Weekly charts

Year-end charts

References

1974 singles
David Essex songs
UK Singles Chart number-one singles
Irish Singles Chart number-one singles
Songs written by David Essex
1974 songs
Song recordings produced by Jeff Wayne